The Tacazze sunbird (Nectarinia tacazze) is a species of bird in the family Nectariniidae.
It is found in Eritrea, Ethiopia, Kenya, South Sudan, Tanzania, and Uganda.

Habitat
The bird is named after the Tacazze or Tekezé River and may easily be observed in nearby districts such as Degua Tembien in north Ethiopia. The species is found in evergreen forest, mountain woodlands and areas with scattered trees including Ficus sp., Euphorbia abyssinica and Juniperus procera.

References

Tacazze sunbird
Birds of East Africa
Birds described in 1814
Taxonomy articles created by Polbot